WAUF-LP (97.3 FM, "Revocation Radio") is a radio station licensed to serve Auburn, Alabama.  The station is owned by Core Radio Ministry, Inc. It airs a Christian rock and hip-hop  radio format targeted at teens, college students, and young adults.

The station was assigned the WAUF-LP call letters by the Federal Communications Commission on August 13, 2004.

References

External links

WAUF-LP service area per the FCC database

Contemporary Christian radio stations in the United States
AUF-LP
Lee County, Alabama
Radio stations established in 2004
AUF-LP